Lakewood Center is a super-regional shopping mall in Lakewood, California. Lakewood Center opened in 1952 and was enclosed in 1978.

The interior mall is anchored by Costco, Forever 21, JCPenney, Macy's, a Round One Entertainment center, and Target. Several businesses surround the mall property, including 24 Hour Fitness, Albertsons, Best Buy, Burlington, and The Home Depot. 

At , the Lakewood Center is ranked among the largest retail shopping malls by gross leasable area in the United States.

History
Lakewood Center opened in 1952, serving the post-war planned community of Lakewood. The mall was originally anchored by two department stores: a four-level, 347,000 square-foot May Company and a three-level, 88,000 square-foot Butler Brothers. 

New stores were built in the following years, though they were not connected to the mall proper. 1965 brought two new department stores to the property: a four-level Bullock's and a two-level Buffums, both in standalone locations outside of the mall. Two years later, the existing mall was expanded to accommodate a two-level, 173,000 square-foot JCPenney store on the mall's south end. A standalone Pacific Theatres two-screen cinema opened in the mall's parking lot in 1968, which was later expanded to four screens in 1975. The 1970s brought another department store to the property, with a two-level, 155,000 square-foot Montgomery Ward opening in 1975 in place of the former Butler Bros., which shuttered the previous year. The Lakewood Center continued to grow in size and scale into the 1980s, with the addition of another Pacific-owned three-screen cinema (branded Pacific Theatres Lakewood Center South 1-2-3) adjacent to Buffums in 1981. A new wing anchored by a two-level, 80,000 square-foot Mervyn's was constructed on the eastern side of the center in 1982, adding a second corridor to the mall's barbell shape.

Consolidation in the department store industry led to several major changes at the Lakewood Center, as their large spaces began to turn over. Buffums shuttered in 1991 as a result of a company liquidation, while Bullock's closed in 1993 due to the bankruptcy of parent company R.H. Macy & Co. That same year, May Company consolidated its two department stores nameplates in the western United States - May Co. and Robinson's - into Robinsons-May. The southern Pacific Theatres complex expanded into the former Buffums in 1992, adding six more screens in the process, while the former Bullock's was demolished to accommodate The Home Depot, which opened in 1995. The original Pacific Theatres four-screen complex was shuttered in 1998 for a dramatic expansion and renovation, and reopened in 1999 as a modern sixteen-screen multiplex. 

Changes continued into the new millennium, as a new Mervyn's store was constructed adjacent to its original 1982 location. The new, single-level Mervyn's opened in August of 2000, with the original Mervyn's building then repurposed as a new wing of shops leading to a newly-constructed two-level, 210,000 square-foot Macy's - the first newly-built Macy's store in Southern California.  At the same time, Montgomery Ward shuttered as part of a chainwide liquidation, ending operations in March of 2001. The former Montgomery Ward was then demolished to accommodate a new two-level, 160,000 square-foot Target store, which opened in October 2003. 

Robinsons-May was rebranded as a Macy's after the merger of May Company with Macy's parent Federated Department Stores in 2006. The Macy's store built only five years earlier was shuttered in favor of the larger Robinsons-May building,  and the one-time Macy's was demolished the following year and replaced by an unattached Costco warehouse, which opened in February 2009. The southern Pacific Theatres complex closed in 2008 and was replaced by a 24 Hour Fitness. Finally, Mervyn's filed for bankruptcy protection in 2008 and closed its stores in 2009, leading to Forever 21 purchasing the company's Lakewood lease and opening a large-scale store in the former Mervyn's building.

The property's remaining Pacific Theatres complex closed temporarily in March 2020 due to the COVID-19 pandemic, only to close permanently a year later.

References

External links
Lakewood Center Official Website

Macerich
Shopping malls in the South Bay, Los Angeles
Lakewood, California
Shopping malls established in 1951